"Terang Bulan" is a traditional Indonesian song. This song is an adaptation based on the song named "La Rosalie".

History
The song was a traditional folk song adapted from the popular French melody of La Rosalie. Following the popularity of the French melody, it became a popular Indonesian folk song as well as for Malays at parties and cabarets in the Malay Peninsula from the 1920s to the 1930s. Since the independence of the Federation of Malaya in 1957, public performances of the song and its melody have outlawed, as any such use is proscribed by statute.

Lyrics

Other versions 
Several lyrics set to the tune exist, with their meanings being very similar, as the exact original lyrics are generally considered to be unknown.

Felix Mendelssohn & His Hawaiian Serenaders used the tune of Terang Bulan in their song Mamula Moon, on their 1947 album Paradise Isle.

Dutch version 
Dutch singer Zangeres Zonder Naam recorded a Dutch version of "Terang Bulan" (spelt "Terang Boelan"). The meaning in the Dutch version is entirely different from the original lyrics, although the Dutch version mentions the island of Java.

Other adaptation from the similar French melody

Perak State Anthem 

Sultan Idris Murshidul’adzam Shah, the ruler of Perak, was aware of the song's popularity during his exile in the Seychelles for abetting murder. When the Sultan represented the other rulers of the Federated Malay States at the coronation of King Edward VII in 1901, his protocol officer was asked what his state anthem was. The Sultan realised that his state did not possess an anthem, proceeded to hum the aforementioned tune in order not to appear backwards to his hosts, thus 'creating' the state anthem of Perak.

Malaysian National Anthem 

Tunku Abdul Rahman, the Chief Minister and Minister for Home Affairs of the Federation of Malaya, selected Perak's state anthem as the Federation's national hymn, on account of its "traditional flavour". The tune was rechristened "Negaraku" and the lyrics were changed, with popular performances in cabarets and parties halting as it became proscribed by statute. When Malaysia was formed in 1963, the song remained the national anthem.

References

External links 
 Web.archive.org

19th-century songs
Songwriter unknown
Year of song unknown